Nordheim (also spelled Norheim) is a hamlet and basic statistical unit (grunnkrets) in the municipality of Voss in Vestland county, Norway.

The settlement was attested as Norem in 1563 and 1611 (and as Noreim in 1695 and Norheim in 1723). The original name is reconstructed as the compound *Norðreimr, from norðr 'north' and (h)eimr 'home, house'.

References

External links
Nordheim at FINN kart
Nordheim at Norgeskart

Voss
Villages in Vestland